Shlomi Lavie is an Israeli-born American-based musician, best known as the drummer for Marcy Playground. He has also played with various other bands, including Nanuchka and Electro Morocco in New York City, and formerly with The Magical Mystery Tour, a Beatles tribute group, and Habiluim in Tel Aviv.

Marcy Playground
Lavie joined Marcy Playground in late 2008, replacing drummer Gonzalo Martinez De La Cotera. He was referred to lead singer John Wozniak by bassist Dylan Keefe's wife, who is one of Shlomi's best friends. Wozniak was impressed with Lavie's talent, and Lavie soon joined the band.

Other Associated Acts
'Electro Morocco is a four-piece band based in Brooklyn, NY, which can best be summed up as a mixture of energetic electro beats with a Middle Eastern flavor, a pop edge and some retro rock.

References

External links
Shlomi Lavie's myspace
Van Goose Website

Marcy Playground members
American drummers
Jewish American musicians
Living people
Musicians from Brooklyn
Musicians from Haifa
Israeli people of Libyan-Jewish descent
Year of birth missing (living people)
21st-century American Jews